Senitam Khusro, was an Iranian military officer, who served as the commander of Armenia from 605/6 to 606/7 under the Sasanian king Khosrow II (r. 590–628).

Senitam is first mentioned 605/6 as being appointed as the leader of the Sasanian invasion of Armenia, thus succeeding the previous Sasanian commander of Armenia, Datoyean. Senitam shortly outflanked the troops of the Byzantine commander at Anglon, Theodosius Khorkhoruni. The Byzantines then asked for an allowance to withdraw from the city, but were defeated and routed during a surprise attack by Senitam, who captured Theodosius. Senitam then defeated another army in Phasiane, while various fortresses fell under Sasanian control. Later in 606/7, Senitam was succeeded by Ashtat Yeztayar.

Sources

6th-century births
People of the Byzantine–Sasanian War of 602–628
7th-century Iranian people
8th-century deaths
7th century in Armenia
Generals of Khosrow II